is a ninja yaoi manga by Temari Matsumoto. The manga was licensed in the United States by BLU, the Boys Love branch of TokyoPop, in November 2005.

Plot

Another work by Temari Matsumoto, called Cause of My Teacher also includes a story about Hiiragi and Asagi.

Reception
Krista Hutley for the Library Journal said of Shinobu Kokoro: "Themes of passion and loyalty weave through the three romances, which are sweet if superficial."  Tom Rosin for MangaLife noted the explicitness of the manga.  Reviewer Julie Rosato disliked how young and compliant the ukes were in the stories, but enjoyed Matsumoto's semes.

References

External links

Manga anthologies
2004 manga
Ninja in anime and manga
Tokyopop titles
Yaoi anime and manga